is a Japanese women's professional shogi player ranked 2-dan.

Promotion history
Hasegawa's promotion history is as follows:
 2-kyū: October 1, 2011
 1-dan: October 29, 2011
 2-dan: February 2, 2012

Note: All ranks are women's professional ranks.

Titles and other championships
Hasegawa has appeared in only one major title match to date. She challenged for the 5th  title in 2012, but lost.

Personal life
On December 24, 2019, it was announced that Hasegawa had married professional go player Toru Taniguchi. The announcement also stated that Hasegawa would continue to compete under her maiden name.

References

External links
 ShogiHub: Hasegawa, Yuki

Japanese shogi players
Living people
Women's professional shogi players
Professional shogi players from Hyōgo Prefecture
1995 births